Broadcast call signs are call signs assigned as unique identifiers to radio stations and television stations. While broadcast radio stations will often brand themselves with plain-text names, identities such as "cool FM", "rock 105" or "the ABC network" are not globally unique. Another station in another city or country may (and often will) have a similar brand, and the name of a broadcast station for legal purposes is normally its internationally recognised ITU call sign. Some common conventions are followed around the world.

North America

Broadcast stations in North America generally use callsigns in the international series.

United States

In the United States, the first letter generally is K for stations west of the Mississippi River (including Alaska, America Samoa, Guam, Hawaii, and Northern Mariana Islands) and W for those east of the Mississippi River (including Puerto Rico and the U.S. Virgin Islands).  Except for those with their radio channel or physical TV channel number in them, all new callsigns have been four letters (plus any suffix like -FM or -TV) for some decades, though there are historical three-letter callsigns still in use today, such as KSL in Salt Lake City and WGN in Chicago.  Co-owned stations were also allowed to adopt their original short AM callsign like WGN-TV and KSL-TV, even after new ones were prohibited.

There are a number of exceptions to the east/west rule, such as KDKA in Pittsburgh and WFAA in Dallas-Fort Worth, but these are historical artifacts grandfathered from a rule change in the 1920s.  Most of the exceptions are located in the media markets immediately adjacent to the river, in the state of Louisiana in the metropolitan areas of Baton Rouge and greater New Orleans, and markets north of the river's source such as Fargo-Moorhead and Duluth-Superior.

The westernmost station in the continental United States beginning with W is WOAI in San Antonio. WVUV-FM in  Fagaitua, American Samoa, is the westernmost station with a W call sign. KYW in Philadelphia is currently the easternmost station with a K call sign.

Another exception to this is that NIST time-broadcasting stations have a three- or four-letter callsign beginning with WWV.  The three current government-operated time stations, WWV (and longwave sister station WWVB), and WWVH, are located in Fort Collins, Colorado and Kekaha, Hawaii, respectively, both of which would normally use call signs beginning with "K". However, the rule dividing W and K only applies to stations governed by the Federal Communications Commission (FCC), whereas U.S. federal government stations are governed by the NTIA.  This means that like NIST, the hundreds of NOAA Weather Radio stations across the country have a random mix of W and K callsigns, as do traveler information stations operated by the National Park Service.

International shortwave
The US government-operated international broadcaster the Voice of America no longer uses callsigns assigned to it; however, Radio Canada International's transmitter in Sackville, New Brunswick was assigned CKCX.  Privately operated shortwave stations, like WWCR and CFRX, also have call signs.

Canada
In Canada, the publicly owned Canadian Broadcasting Corporation uses CB; privately owned commercial broadcast stations use primarily CF and CH through CK prefixes. Four stations licensed to St. John's by the Dominion of Newfoundland government (VOWR, VOAR-FM, VOCM, and VOCM-FM) retain their original VO calls. The CB prefix used by CBC stations actually belongs to Chile rather than Canada, and is in use by the CBC through an international agreement. Low-power broadcast translator stations begin with VF for FM and CH for TV, followed by four numerals assigned sequentially. Unlike the United States, all Digital TV stations use the "-DT" suffix instead of keeping the "-TV" suffix.

Mexico
In Mexico, AM radio stations use XE call signs (such as XEW-AM), while the majority of FM radio and television stations use XH. Broadcast callsigns are normally four or five letters in length, plus the -FM or -TV suffix where applicable, though several older stations have only three letters. The longest callsign is six letters, plus suffix: XHMORE-FM. All Mexican TV stations using Digital TV signals use the "-TDT" suffix.

Central America

Costa Rica
Costa Rica uses TI call signs.
Examples:
TI-TNS (channel 2)
TI-IVS (channel 4)
TI-TV6 (channel 6)
TI-TCR (channel 7)
TI-DE (channel 9)
TI-BYK (channel 11)
TI-SRN (channel 13)

El Salvador
El Salvador uses YS, YX and HU call signs depending on geographical area.
Examples:
YSR-TV (channel 2)
YSU-TV (channel 4)
YSLA-TV (channel 6)

Guatemala
Guatemala uses TG call signs. Examples:
TGV-TV (channel 3)
TGVG-TV (channel 7)
TGMO-TV (channel 11)
TGSS-TV (channel 13)

Honduras
Honduras uses HR call signs.
Examples:
HRTG-TV (channel 5)
HRLP-TV (Telecadena)
HRCV-TV (TSi)

Nicaragua
Nicaragua uses YN call signs.
Examples:
YNTC: Channel 2
YNTM: Channel 4
YNSA: Channel 6
YNLG: Channel 12

Caribbean

Dominican Republic
Dominican Republic uses HI callsigns.
Examples:
HIJB: Channel 2/11
HISD: Channel 4
HITM: Channel 5
HIN: Channel 7
HIMQ: Channel 9
HIND: Channel 13

South America
In South America call signs have been a traditional way of identifying radio and TV stations. Some stations still broadcast their call signs a few times a day, but this practice is becoming very rare. Argentinian broadcast call signs consist of two or three letters followed by multiple numbers, the second and third letters indicating region.

Brazil
In Brazil, radio and TV stations are identified by a ZY, a third letter and three numbers. ZYA, ZYB, ZYR, and ZYT are allocated to television stations; ZYI, ZYJ, ZYK and ZYL designate AM stations; ZYG is used for shortwave stations; ZYC, ZYD, ZYM and ZYU are given to FM stations.

Colombia
In Colombia, the radio stations or television channels  are identified by HJ and/or HK with two additional letters.
Examples:
HJRN: Channel 1
HJJX: RCN
HJCY: Caracol TV

Venezuela
Venezuela uses YV call signs.
Examples:
YVKA: TVN (defunct)

Peru
Peru uses OAY-4 callsigns in Lima.

Argentina
Argentina uses the letters “LS” followed by a two-digit number.
Examples:
LS82TV: Channel 7
LS83TV: Channel 9
LS84TV: Telefe
LS85TV: Channel 13

Paraguay
Paraguay uses ZPV-(three digit number)-TV call signs.

Example:
 SNT: ZPV 900 TV

Bolivia
Bolivia uses CP call signs.

Examples:
 Bolivia TV: CP 3 TV
 Bolivisión: CP 42 TV

Uruguay
Uruguay uses the word CXB followed by a number as a callsign.

Chile 
Chilean AM radio stations use the letter C, followed by one of the letters: A, B, C, D or E. The usage of each of those depends on the latitude of the cities where they operate (for example: the letter B is used for stations in the central region of Chile). FM stations use the XQ prefix, with the same A-E additional letters for AM stations. The resulting prefix is followed by a number which may not match their FM frequency.

Examples:

 XQB-8: Radio Agricultura
 XQB-143: Radio Cooperativa

As opposed to many South American countries, television stations in Chile have never used any call signs, and instead are identified only by their names.

Australia

In Australia, broadcast call signs are allocated by the Australian Communications and Media Authority and are unique for each broadcast station.

The international VL prefix assigned to radio broadcasters has been skipped for many years, thus VL5UV would only identify as 5UV, and now simply Radio Adelaide.  The digit often, but not always, indicates the state or territory, generally followed by two letters on AM and three on FM. Stations with call signs beginning in 2 are based in New South Wales or the ACT, 3 in Victoria, 4 in Queensland, 5 in South Australia, 6 in Western Australia, 7 in Tasmania, and 8 in the Northern Territory.

Philippines 
In the Philippines, stations may use callsigns in the following manner: callsigns beginning with DW and DZ represent all stations in Metro Manila and parts of Luzon. Calls beginning with DY represent all stations in Visayas, parts of Palawan and Masbate; and callsigns beginning with DX represents all stations in Mindanao. Originally from 1920 to 1940 callsigns beginning with KZ were assigned to all stations in the Philippines.

Other regions
Most European and Asian countries do not use call signs to identify broadcast stations, but Japan (JO), South Korea (HL), the Philippines (DW, DZ, DY and DX) and Taiwan (BE) do have call sign systems. Britain has no call signs in the American sense, but broadcast stations are allowed to choose their own trademark call sign up to six words in length.

In Japan, Tokyo, Osaka, Nagoya and regions of Japan, television and radio stations identify as JO__.

Callbooks

A directory of radio station call signs is called a callbook. Callbooks were originally bound books that resembled a telephone directory and contains the name and addressees of licensed radio stations in a given jurisdiction (country). Modern Electrics published the first callbook in the United States in 1909.

Today, the primary purpose of a callbook is to allow amateur radio operators to send a confirmation post card, called a QSL card, to an operator with whom they have communicated via radio. Callbooks have evolved to include on-line databases that are accessible via the Internet to instantly obtain the address of another amateur radio operator and their QSL Managers.  The most well known and used on-line QSL databases include QRZ.COM, IK3QAR, HamCall, F6CYV, DXInfo, OZ7C and QSLInfo.

References

External links
Industry Canada's List of Available Call Signs
FCC's call-sign search tool

See also
Amateur radio call signs
Callbook
ITU prefix
Pseudonym
Station identification

Call signs
Call sign